Carl Berntsen (5 July 1913 – 28 September 2004) was a Danish sailor. He competed in the 8 Metre event at the 1936 Summer Olympics.

References

External links
 

1913 births
2004 deaths
Danish male sailors (sport)
Olympic sailors of Denmark
Sailors at the 1936 Summer Olympics – 8 Metre
People from Solrød Municipality
Sportspeople from Copenhagen